A Daughter of the Old South is a lost 1918 American drama silent film directed by Émile Chautard and written by Alicia Ramsey, Rudolph de Cordova and Margaret Turnbull. The film stars Pauline Frederick, Pedro de Cordoba, Vera Beresford, Rex McDougall, Mrs. T. Randolph and Myra Brooks. The film was released on November 24, 1918, by Paramount Pictures.

Plot

Cast
Pauline Frederick as Dolores Jardine
Pedro de Cordoba as Pedro de Alvarez
Vera Beresford as Lillian Hetherington
Rex McDougall as Richard Ferris
Mrs. T. Randolph as Dolores' Grandmother
Myra Brooks as The Housekeeper
James Laffey as Mr. Hetherington

References

External links 
 
 

1918 films
1910s English-language films
Silent American drama films
1918 drama films
Paramount Pictures films
Films directed by Emile Chautard
American black-and-white films
Lost American films
American silent feature films
1918 lost films
Lost drama films
1910s American films